Thylacodes grandis is a species of gastropods belonging to the family Vermetidae.

The species is found in Malesia.

References

Littorinimorpha